Friginatica is a genus of sea snails, marine gastropod molluscs in the family Naticidae, the moon shells.

Species
Species within the genus Friginatica include:
 Friginatica aldingensis (Tate 1893)
 Friginatica amphiala (Watson, 1881)
 Friginatica beddomei (Johnston, 1885)
 Friginatica conjuncta Dell, 1953
 Friginatica wintlei

References 
 Powell A. W. B. (1979), New Zealand Mollusca, William Collins Publishers Ltd, Auckland, New Zealand 
 
 
 

Naticidae